Chadayamangalam is  a village located in Kollam district of Kerala state, India. It is located along the Ithikkara river and the MC road that passes across the major urban locations of Kerala. It acts as centre for Chadayamangalam block panchayat, gram panchayat and assembly constituency. It hosts numerous government institutions including hospitals, schools and police station. Chadayamngalam is well noticed for newly constructed Jatayu Earth’s Center, which is a tourism centre in the town with the world’s largest bird sculpture..The place is also referred to as Jatayumangalam.

Details

Chadayamangalam is 37.5 km away from the City of Kollam and 43 km away from the capital city of the state, Thiruvananthapuram. The town is located Kilimanoor and Kottarakara, 14 km away from Kilimanoor and 21 km from Kottarakara. It is situated on the southeast side of  Kottarakkara Taluk. Population is of 22,213. Panchayat  includes Chithra, Kadakkal, Chadayamangalam, Ittiva, Velinalloor, Elamadu & Nilamel.

Historical Background

The origins of the town is traced by historians to at least 8th-9th century AD. The Ay dynasty which acted as buffer between Pandya and Chera dynasty mainly shifting between independent rule and Pandyan overlordship. The conquest of Ay Kingdom in 765 CE by Pandya king Jatila Paranthaka/Nedum Chadayan Varaguna I (r. 765–815 AD) and sack of port Vizhinjam by defeating the Vel chieftain (the Vel Mannan, who might have been related to the Ay family) possession of the Ay-Vel country ("the fertile country along with its magnificent treasures") (Madras Museum Plates of Jatila Parantaka, 17th year). This event is also remembered in the Velvikkudi plates (3rd regnal year, Nedum Chadayan) as "the suppression of the rebellious Ay-Vel. The Pandya king "Maran Chadayan" Jatila Paranthaka destroyed a fort at Aruviyoor (Aruvikkarai near Thalakulam) by defeating Chadayan Karunanthan of "Malai Nadu" in 788 AD (23rd year, Kalukumalai inscription). In 792 AD (27th year, Jatila Paranthaka) the Chera warriors (the Cheramanar Padai) are seen fighting for a fort at Vizhinjam and at Karaikkotta (Karaikkodu near Thalakulam) against a commander of Maran Chadayan (Trivandrum Museum Inscription of Maran Chadayan).

This historical evidences points to existing Ay/Vel kings with name Chadayan (Maran Chadayan) along with the invader of the kingdom 'Nedum Chadayan' also holding a similar name. What makes this relatable to the town of Chadayamangalam is the presence of the Kottukal rock cut temple located just inside 4 km from the town center. The temple was built around 8th-9th century according to archeological sources and follows the Pandyan/Ay style of architecture pronounced in other rock temples in southern Tamil Nadu and Kerala. A similar temple can be seen in Vizinjam, the capital of Ay Kingdom dated to the 8th century. Even though there are huge similarities to the Pandyan rock cut temples built at the same time in core Pandyan territory, the possibility of Ay kings to have adopted the architecture cannot be left out.

This ambiguity is further strengthened as it was time of Pandyan conquest into the Ay kingdom (Pandyans continued to occupy the southern portions around Vizinjam till the next century while northern portions detached away to form Venad) and the closest town to Chadayamangalam is Ayur, which loosely translates to the town/village/place of the Ay in colloquial Malayalam and Tamil. So all this shines light on the place having a Pandyan or/and Ay patronage in antiquity with a name that derived from the name of ruler of the same area.

Mythological Background

Araṇya-Kāṇḍa of Ramayana mentions that Jatayu is the "King of Vultures"(gṛdhrarāja). According to the epic, the demon Ravana was abducting the goddess Sita to Lanka when Jatayu tried to rescue her. Jatayu fought valiantly with Ravana, but as Jatayu was very old Ravana soon defeated him, clipping his wings, and Jatayu falls down to earth. Rama and Lakshmana while on the search for Sita, chanced upon the stricken and dying Jatayu, who informed them of the battle with Ravana and told them that Ravana had headed South. Jatayu then died of his wounds and Rama performed his final funeral rites.  Popular belief is that surrounds Chadayamangalam is that the entire course of event following Jadayu falling and rituals performed happened here.It is to be noted that Chadayamangalam shares this origin myth with two other places in India, Lepakshi in Andhra Pradesh and Vijayaraghava Perumal temple in Tamil Nadu. 

Chadayamangalam consists of the Kodandarama temple at the peak of Jadayu para (more commonly called Mellupara) placed 1000 feet above the sea level. Chadayamagalam also has other numerous small mountains like Vayanam Mala, Pavoor Mala, Alathara Mala, Elambrakodu Mala, Arkannur Madappara Mala and Thevannur Mala marking its natural beauty. The associated story in the temple premises include presence of “Kokkarani” (water tank),  Jadayu created by rubbing the rock with his beak.  As the time has come for the bird to leave his body after hearing narrative of Sitaapaharan, Lord Ram is believed to have performed the last rites of Jadayu. Thus, the Lord granted salvation to Jatayu by standing on one leg on the top of the Jatayu rock, where his foot print surfaced and it exists even now. This site of footprint and the source of water sprinkling out at the top of the rocky mountain through out the year is revered by devotees coming to the temple.Numerous wild monkeys belonging to bonnet macaque species is also found making the mountain their home.

Agriculture
Paddy, Coconut, Rubber. Tapioca, Pepper, Cashew Nut, Banana, Areca Nuts etc. are the major crops under cultivation in the block.

Political Administration

Chadayamangalam village comes under Chadayamangalam gram panchayat, Chadayamangalam block panchayat and Kollam jilla panchayat. It is part of Chadayamangalam state constituency in the Kerala assembly elections and Kollam constituency for the Indian parliament elections.

See also
 Jatayu Earth's Center Nature Park

References

Villages in Kollam district